The 2014 San Marino GO&FUN Open was a professional tennis tournament played on clay courts. The 27th edition of the tournament, which was part of the 2014 ATP Challenger Tour, took place in City of San Marino, San Marino between 4 and 10 August 2014.

Singles main-draw entrants

Seeds

 1 Rankings are as of July 28, 2014.

Other entrants
The following players received wildcards into the singles main draw:
  Alessandro Giannessi 
  Máximo González 
  Filip Krajinović
  Viktor Troicki

The following players received a special exemption into the singles main draw:
  Federico Gaio
  Roberto Marcora

The following players received entry from the qualifying draw:
  Cristian Garín
  Giovanni Lapentti
  Wilson Leite 
  Antonio Veić

Champions

Singles

 Adrian Ungur def.  Antonio Veić 6–1, 6–0

Doubles

 Radu Albot /  Enrique López Pérez def.  Franko Škugor /  Adrian Ungur 6–4, 6–1

External links
Official Website
ITF Search
ATP official site

San Marino GOandFUN Open
San Marino GO&FUN Open